Nationality words link to articles with information on the nation's poetry or literature (for instance, Irish or France).

Works published

Great Britain
 Sir David Lindsay (also spelled "David Lyndsay"), publication year uncertain
 Luke Shepherd:
 Antipus
 , publication year uncertain; an anti-Catholic poem
 John Bon and Mast Person, publication year uncertain; the author was imprisoned twice on account of this work
 Pathos, publication year uncertain
 The Upcheering of the Mass

Other
 Luigi Alamanni, Girone il Cortese, a poetical romance; Italian writer published in Paris, France
 Anna Bijns, Refrains, Netherlands, second edition (prior edition 1528, subsequent edition 1567)
 Francisco Robortelli, In Aristotelis poeticam explicationes, commentary reinterpreting Aristotle's Poetics for the humanist; Florence; criticism, (second edition 1555), Italy
 Thomas Sébillet Art poëtique françoys, on French verse; criticism

Births
Death years link to the corresponding "[year] in poetry" article:
 Luis Barahona de Soto (died 1595), Spanish poet and physician
 Juraj Baraković (died 1628), Croatian Renaissance poet from Zadar
 Giles Fletcher, the Elder (born 1548 or 1549) (died 1611), English poet and diplomat
 Edward Grant (died 1601), English scholar, poet, and headmaster of Westminster School
 Cornelis Ketel (died 1616), Dutch Mannerist painter, poet and orator
 Jean de La Ceppède (died 1623), French poet
 Karel van Mander (died 1606), Flemish-born Dutch painter and poet
 Geoffrey Whitney (died 1601), English poet
 Ma Xianglan (died 1604), Chinese artist, playwright, poet and calligrapher; a woman

Deaths
Birth years link to the corresponding "[year] in poetry" article:
 Zâtî  (born 1471), Turkish poet who taught and greatly influenced Bâkî
 John Bellenden (born 1500), English
 Johannes Dantiscus (born 1485), bishop and poet known as the Father of Polish Diplomacy

See also

 Poetry
 16th century in poetry
 16th century in literature
 French Renaissance literature
 Renaissance literature
 Spanish Renaissance literature

References

16th-century poetry
Poetry